Flash & Snowball is a 2005 album by Aja West and Cheeba. They are the founders of the Mackrosoft Records music label. Aja West is the leader and conductor of the funk group The Mackrosoft, and Cheeba is the leader of The Cheebacabra. Each brother plays in the other's band.

Overview

The album was written in tribute to the two cats the artists grew up with, one of which was deaf but enjoyed "listening" to music.  Flash & Snowball won Best Jam Album at the 2006 Independent Music Awards.

Track listing 
All tracks mixed by Aja West and Cheeba.
 "The Arrival" – 3.56
 "Alene's Farm" – 3:08
 "Jaws" – 4:23
 "Cindy" – 4:23
 "Special Food" – 2:31
 "Christmas Tinsel" – 3:15
 "The Sister" – 2:53
 "Me and Snow" – 5:07
 "Cosmic Catnip" - 4:29
 "Last of The Mokawkins" - 3:52
 "Future Felines" - 3:53
 "The Beanbag Game" - 3:51
 "The Departure" - 2:38
 "Saturday Candy" - 4:47

Personnel
The following people contributed to Flash & Snowball.

Musicians
Aja West – rhodes electric piano, clavinet, moog opus 3, ensoniq asr 10, juno 60, foot system pedal synth, octave cat, guitaret, organ, bass, percussion 
Cheeba – rhodes electric piano, clavinet, moog voyager, prophet 5, juno 60, ARP string ensemble, yamaha organ, tenor sax, melodica, percussion 
Rich Lambert – drums 
Alex Veley – rhodes electric piano, clavinet 
Mike Porcaro – electric bass 
Nick Allison – piano 
Steve Moore (musician) – wurlitzer, trombone, vibes 
Gould Effect – sax 
Steve Black – electric guitar 
Snakerhythms – sax with effects 
Cedric Ross – electric bass 
Heather Porcaro – worm guitar, synth 
Scott Koziol – electric bass 
Victor Tapia – conga, shaker, chimes

Production
Aja West – producer, mixing 
Cheeba – producer, mixing
Nathan Cheever – album cover artist

References 

2005 albums
Aja West and Cheeba albums